Ulrich Jean Eugène Ramé (born 19 September 1972) is a French former professional footballer who played as a goalkeeper.

In a professional career which spanned two decades, he played mainly for Bordeaux (14 seasons), appearing in more than 500 official matches and winning six major titles.

A French international during four years, Ramé represented the nation at Euro 2000.

Club career
Born in Nantes, Ramé started playing professionally with SCO Angers, making his Ligue 1 debut in 1993–94 but being immediately relegated. Two years later the Maine-et-Loire club dropped down another division, but the player returned to the top flight the following season, signing for FC Girondins de Bordeaux.

After 23 appearances in his debut campaign, helping his team finish fifth and reach the domestic League Cup final the following year, Ramé became Bordeaux's undisputed first-choice. He helped the side win two national championships – separated by ten years – and three more league cups.

In the 2009–10 campaign, after Cédric Carrasso's signing, 37-year-old Ramé became the backup. In June 2011, after 520 matches played with the Girondins all competitions comprised, he returned to Ligue 2 and joined CS Sedan Ardennes.

International career
Ramé made his debut for France on 9 June 1999, in a UEFA Euro 2000 qualifying 1–0 win in Andorra. He was subsequently picked for the final stages' squad, with the national team winning the tournament; after Bernard Lama's international retirement, he became second-choice.

Ramé played three matches at the 2001 FIFA Confederations Cup, with France again emerging victorious. Again as a backup, he represented the nation in the 2002 FIFA World Cup, also in South Korea; after making a blunder against Czech Republic on 12 February 2003, however, he fell out of favor with manager Jacques Santini and was not recalled again.

Managerial statistics

Honours
Bordeaux
Division/Ligue 1: 1998–99, 2008–09
Coupe de la Ligue: 2001–02, 2006–07, 2008–09; runner-up: 1997–98, 2009–10
Trophée des Champions: 2008, 2009; runner-up: 1999

France
UEFA European Championship: 2000
FIFA Confederations Cup: 2001

Notes

References

External links

 
 
 
 
 
 

1972 births
Living people
Footballers from Nantes
French footballers
France international footballers
Association football goalkeepers
Ligue 1 players
Ligue 2 players
Championnat National players
Angers SCO players
FC Girondins de Bordeaux players
CS Sedan Ardennes players
UEFA Euro 2000 players
2001 FIFA Confederations Cup players
2002 FIFA World Cup players
FIFA Confederations Cup-winning players
UEFA European Championship-winning players
French football managers
FC Girondins de Bordeaux managers
Ligue 1 managers